Ahangama is a suburb of Galle. It is located within the Principality of Ruhuna, Sri Lanka, Southern Province. It is situated on the boundary of Galle District and Matara District. It is a major centre which connects Matara District with Galle District. It is a major suburb on the A02 highway, after Galle. It is a major centre on the road for the vehicles and long distance buses run on the route. Ahangama is surrounded by towns such as Habaraduwa, Koggala, Weligama and Imaduwa.

History

The temple is renowned for its Kandyan-style paintings in the main shrine, dating from the late 19th century. The paintings of musicians, dancers and European figures illustrates an interesting piece of social history. Some of the Jatake tales (episodes from the Buddha's series of 550 previous lives) are painted here, and purportedly are 200 years old. There are also some cameo-style paintings of Queen Victoria and the Queen Mother, done in gratitude of Queen Victoria's role in ensuring the free practice of Buddhism outlined in the Kandyan capitulation of Lanka in 1815.

Ahangama is also the home to the Giniwella Kathaluwa and the ancient  Temples. The Kathaluwa Buddhist temple is known for its murals and for the preserved first printing press, brought by the Dutch to Sri Lanka.

Tourism
Ahangama is a very calm and peaceful beach town with majestic palm trees all around. There is no sound apart from the waves hitting the shore and swaying of the trees making it ideal for a relaxing vacation.

A small town in Southern Province, Ahangama is a secret treasure in Sri Lanka. Known for its pristine beaches, sparkling waters and picturesque landscapes, this town is indeed one of the most beautiful ones in the country. Although it is not fully developed, it is easily accessible via Galle, a major city that lies only 20 minutes from Ahangama. This town, being at the epitome of serenity, is one of the ideal getaways in the country.

Ahangama overlooks the aesthetic Weligama Bay, which is a happening place in the town. The famous tuk-tuk takes passengers from the main city to the Bay. Weligama is the central surfing spot, surfing being one of the main attractions of Ahangama. Apart from surfing, Wellingama offers beachside shops, restaurants, shacks and bars.

The landscapes of Ahangama, along with its fame for surfing, make it what it is today. A pious hideout, Ahangama is heaven on earth.

This town is an attraction of tourism. Ahangama has beautiful beaches such as Kathaluwa beach, Kabalana beach, Ahangama beach, Goviyapana beach and Midigama beach. There are a lot of surfing areas in Ahangama.

Special Activities
The major activity in this area is tourism. There are a lot of hotels and restaurants that are attracted tourists.

There are residential facilities to the foreigners and also to the locals with affordable amount.
  
The area is famous for its distinct stilt fishermen, who erect a single pole in the chest-deep water on the beach, just few meters off-shore, where they perch on a cross bar and using bamboo fishing rods cast their lines out beyond the surf break to catch small fish.

This area is also popular for the coir industry.

The Ahangama area is home to the most consistent, and possibly the best, surf in Sri Lanka. Development is ongoing in parts, but for now it remains a relatively low-key region with a mix of surfer-friendly accommodation and the odd villa. The shoreline consists of slim sandy bays and rocky outcrops, though the highway often runs very close to the shore.

See also
List of towns in Southern Province, Sri Lanka

References

External links

Populated places in Southern Province, Sri Lanka
Seaside resorts in Sri Lanka

 Tourism
https://www.lonelyplanet.com/sri-lanka/the-south/ahangama-and-midigama#must-see

https://www.holidify.com/places/ahangama